Barco Creator was an image manipulation program targeted at the repro and print shop markets. It was developed by Barco Creative Systems a division of the Barco Group and first shown as a prototype at Parigraph in April 1988, then later at Ipex 88). Barco Creative Systems together with D.I.S.C. and Aesthedes merged into Barco Graphics. It ran on several generations of Silicon Graphics computers till the late 1990s. Barco Graphics (later Esko) ColorTone for Windows NT is considered its successor.

History
Until the late 1980s digital retouching required specialized hardware such as the Quantel Paintbox. Barco Creator was one of the first products to run on off-the-shelf SGI workstations instead. Originally targeted at the "high end", Creator evolved into a slightly more mid-market program with the "personal"-edition running on the Indy. Still the price was in the $10k to $100k range depending on options, and additional hardware was sometimes needed to speed up specific operations. While Creator could rely on superior features and performance to justify its price through the mid-1990s, as time progressed each new Photoshop version made the Barco package harder to sell. After the release of version 7.1 in late 1997 there were few new sales. In the end Creator was abandoned, like many of its contemporaries; Dalim Tango, Linotype-Hell DaVinci and Alias Eclipse. Its lineal successor, known as Esko ColorTone was discontinued in 2013.

Features

Software modules

Creator was set up to be a modular system, tailored to the specific needs of each "shop" or user. The base for version 7.0 was the "CT-Brix" software library (colour selection, basic compositing, selection, transformation, shapes, basic colour correction, densitometer, layers etc.), also featured in other Barco Graphics CT (continuous tone) products, e.g. ColorTone. On top of this Creator added the "Creative functions" libraries (special effect filters; mosaic, emboss, b/w, warp etc.), "basic brush" module (size, thickness, shapes, styles, pressure sensitivity), "advanced brush" module (brush profiles, textures), "basic colour correction" module (gradation correction, pick mixer, plane mixer, colour mixer), "advanced colour correction" module (chain all of the basic correction tools, batch corrections, instant preview) and finally the "auto mask" module.

Optional software modules included "PrintView" (preview a given CMYK printing process), "BlackSmith" (modify CMYK files to reduce ink usage, better print quality) and "InkSwitch" (convert CMYK into special ink separations for packaging printing).

Barco ColorTone adds an "Image quality estimator" module (evaluate if an image is printable according to certain quality parameters), but lacks several of the other Creator modules.

Using the "Brix Organizer" software it was possible to group CT-Brix modules into "sessions" customised for the current workflow. One could for example disable both colour correction and the creative functions/filters, giving the operator an interface more focused on painting.

File formats
As of Barco Creator 7 support for foreign (non-Barco) file formats depended on a dedicated software "interface". Interfaces for Creator CVW files, TIFF, PSD (no layers) and EPS/DCS were standard. Optionally one could order interfaces for Hell and Scitex and Scitex online file formats.

Output
For the earlier versions, at least, the primary output were CT RGB (Scitex CT to be exposed on film recorders as LVT and Fire 1000) and CMYK formats (to Scitex, Hell, and IT8). One must keep in mind that the internet was just coming of age, and the whole prepress/magazine industry was almost exclusively based on film photographers and a film workflow.

Development

Hardware

Creator originally ran on Silicon Graphics Power Series computers with one or more processors. By 1993 "Personal Creator" was available for the Indigo, while the "full" Power Creator ran on a Crimson. Later releases were available for the Indy, Indigo2, 02 and Octane computers. It is unknown if Creator will run on the later Octane2, Fuel and Tezro workstations with VPro graphics.

Due to its high end focus Barco developed several dedicated hardware options to speed up Creator.

For the Power Series and Crimson Barco originally supplied a "Colcom/VME" colour computer board, a fast multi-dimensional interpolator. This was replaced in early 1993 with the more powerful "Chameleon" board, integrating the discrete logic of the Colcom board in a custom ASIC. Its main purpose was displaying CMYK colours on the (RGB) monitor quickly. After version 7.0 the Chameleon was also used for accelerating certain colour correction operations.

For the release of Creator 6 Barco also added a Brush-accelerator board that made retouching with large brushes on files of several hundred megabytes possible.

Turnkey workstations were additionally supplied with a WACOM tablet, a Barco Reference Calibrator self-calibrating or Personal Calibrator monitor and SCSI RAID storage, though stripped down versions were also available.

Input was usually from high-end scanners: Linotype-Hell, Crosfield Electronics, Dainippon Screen, or ICG (Itek Color Graphics). From the Indigo/Crimson versions the Howtek D4000 (4000dpi) drum scanner was usually offered as an option. Version 7 supported both the D4000 and the D7500 (5000dpi) scanner.

Release history
The feature set was basically frozen after Creator 7 (June 1996). The most apt comparison to the final release, featurewise, would be Adobe Photoshop 4 (November 1996).

Availability
Barco Creator was discontinued in the late 1990s, and was not picked up by Purup-Eskofot after it purchased the Graphics division of Barco. Neither Barco nor Esko have the ability to issue new licenses anymore. As Creator was only available in single nodelocked licenses, one would need to buy an original system with the license included to have a "full legal version".

See also
Barco ColorTone
Barco Strike!
Dalim Tango
Linotype-Hell DaVinci

References

Barco Graphics software
Raster graphics editors
IRIX software
Technical communication tools